You Are the Boss! is a 2013 South Korean television drama starring Ha Hee-ra, Lee Hyung-chul, Shim Hyung-tak and Kim Bin-woo. The morning soap opera aired on MBC from May 6 to October 4, 2013, on Mondays to Fridays at 7:50 a.m. for 108 episodes.

Cast
Main characters
Ha Hee-ra as Min Ji-soo / Min Ji-won
Lee Hyung-chul as Cha Woo-sung
Shim Hyung-tak as Lee Seon-nam
Kim Bin-woo as Lee Seon-mi

Supporting characters
Park Geun-hyung as Lee Dae-gwan
Cha Joo-ok as Jung In-kyung
Moon Young-mi as Kim Young-ok
Jang Ye-seul as Bae Sa-rang
Jang Hee-soo as Jang Ok-ja
Park Sung-hoon as Yoo Deok-hwa
Hwang Ji-ni as Heo Young-mi
Park Joon-hyuk as Bae Ki-cheol
Moon Seo-yeon as Do Do-hee

References

External links
 
You are the Boss! at MBC Global Media

MBC TV television dramas
2013 South Korean television series debuts
2013 South Korean television series endings
Korean-language television shows
South Korean romance television series
Television series by MBC C&I